Jaycees or United States Junior Chamber is a leadership training and civic organization for people between the ages of 18 and 40.

Jaycee may also refer to:
Jaycee (given name), includes a list of people with the name
Jaycee (Tekken), lucha libre wrestling, video game character

See also
JC (disambiguation)